The 2020–21 Czech First League, known as the Fortuna liga for sponsorship reasons, was the 28th season of the Czech Republic's top-tier football for professional clubs since its establishment in 1993. Slavia Prague have won their twenty-first league title which was their fourth in the last five years. The season was initially scheduled to start on 11 July  but was delayed until 21 August as a consequence of the postponement of the previous season's conclusion due to the outbreak of COVID-19. The first half of the season only had 15 rounds and finished on 19 December, while the spring half commenced on 29 January 2021, the earliest such date in league history.

This season was set to be played with 18 clubs, each team played in the league format with home and away matches, and the bottom three teams were relegated directly to the second league at the end of the season. It was the third season to use VAR, featuring it in six to eight matches per match-week in the first half of the season. From January 2021, all nine matches had VAR. As was the case at the end of the previous season, there will be limited attendance from the fans in the stadiums due to measures related to COVID-19 pandemic.

Summary

This season was the third to have betting agency Fortuna as the title sponsor. In February 2020 the sponsorship contract was extended by another two years to expire in 2023–24. It was also the third season with TV broadcasting rights held by O2 TV, showing all nine matches per match-week. Further, the national broadcaster ČT Sport broadcast one match per round (fourth option) and the newspaper iSport.cz holds rights for the highlights from all matches.

With Slavia, Viktoria, and Sparta finishing top-three in the 2019–20 season, many expected a close race for the title amongst this trio. Sparta and Slavia started the season in strong form with unbeaten runs in their first six matches, while Viktoria lost in the second round in Liberec. The season was postponed in October due to COVID-19 measures with Sparta at the top, followed by Slavia and Viktoria. The race for the title resumed behind closed doors in November with Viktoria's 3–1 win over Sparta in the seventh round and opened up a lead for the rivals Slavia. Sparta and Viktoria suffered another loss in the following round and the gap increased. Slavia maintained their lead for the remainder of the season.

The last match of the autumn program was played on 23 December, the latest such date in Czech league history. Before the four-week winter break, Slavia held a 7-point lead ahead of Sparta and Jablonec. At the other end of the table Brno, Příbram, and Opava were positioned in the relegation zone. Due to several teams having troubles with the COVID-19 during and after the break, the schedule was condensed and an updated league calendar was issued. Mid-week slots were added and the league continued to be played in such format until the end of the season. 

After February's match-week 17 Sparta's 0–1 loss against Bohemians, their coach Václav Kotal was sacked and replaced with three-time league champion and former national team coach, Pavel Vrba, who won his first game in charge against Olomouc, 2-3 away.

During the season, Slavia broke several Czech League all-time records. They achieved a record 41 consecutive matches unbeaten with a draw at Bohemians on 24 April 2021  and increased it to 46 on the last matchday (the run still continues) to finish the whole season with an unbeaten record. Slavia recorded 24 wins, 86 points, and 85 goals scored in a single season, which are season records for the Czech first league.

On 2 May 2021, Sparta drew 2–2 in Liberec, mathematically confirming Slavia as champions for the third successive season. Slavia defeated Viktoria 5–1 in Sinobo Stadium later that evening. Viktoria, positioned 5th, drew the next fixture with Příbram 3–3, and following the match, coach Guľa was sacked.

On 8 May 2021, Opava was confirmed to be the first team to be relegated to the FNL after a 1–1 draw at Zlín, with three games remaining ending their three-year tenure in the first league. A week later on 16 May 2021, 15th-placed Teplice defeated České Budějovice and relegated Brno, immediately returning to the FNL after a season's presence in the top flight. On 23 May 2021, Příbram was the third and final team to be relegated following a 0–1 defeat at home against Pardubice with one game remaining, also ending their First League tenure after three-years.

Teams

Teams relegated from Czech First League
In the last season's format of the league, all teams played a round-robin home and away format of the league. After 30 matches the teams were divided into championship (top 6), play-off (7th–10th), and relegation (bottom 6) groups. Points and goals in the relegation group were fully carried over from the regular season. The last team should have been relegated and the two teams positioned 14th and 15th should have played a playoff format with second league teams positioned second and third. The relegation group was scheduled to conclude on 7 July 2020 but as a result of three Karviná players tested positive for COVID-19, the final two rounds of matches were postponed to 23 and 26 July. On 23 July, the date of the first postponed round, one player from Opava tested positive and the team was placed into two weeks long isolation which led to the abandonment of the last two rounds.

On 24 July the league FA announced that due to time pressure, the relegation group would remain unfinished. As a consequence, no team can be relegated and the winner of the second league was promoted. To avoid playing the 2020–21 season with an odd number of teams, automatic promotion was granted to the second-placed team as well. The eliminations play-offs were cancelled and the number of participants for 2020–21 season increased from 16 to 18.

At the end of the regular season, the last position was occupied 1. FK Příbram, with elimination playoff spots held by MFK Karviná and SFC Opava. The same order was recorded after playing three rounds of the relegation group.

Teams promoted to Czech First League 

The second league was also impacted by COVID pandemic but fully finished after a delay. On 11 July 2020 in the penultimate round of the season FK Pardubice beat Vyšehrad 4–1 and secured automatic promotion for the first time in Czech football history. Pardubice were previously represented three times in the Czechoslovak First League, by another team from the city, most recently in 1968.

Since the decision that all sixteen teams would remain in the top league and to prevent having an odd number of participants, the second place holder Brno was invited to join the top tier after two years absence. Third-placed team Dukla Prague remained in the second league without the right to play a playoff match.

Locations and stadiums 

The home stadium of a newly promoted FK Pardubice is not certified by the league to host the First League matches. The club opted to play their home league matches at Bohemians' Ďolíček stadium.

Personnel and kits

Managerial changes

League table

Table progress

Results

Season statistics

Top scorers 

Updated at the end of the season.

Hat-tricks 

Notes
4 Player scored 4 goals(H) – Home team(A) – Away team

Clean sheets 
Updated at the end of the season.

Awards

Monthly awards

Annual awards

Attendance

See also 
 2020–21 Czech Cup
 2020–21 Czech National Football League

References

2020–21 in European association football leagues
1
2020–21
Czech First League